Mike Potts (born March 5, 1985) is a former American football quarterback. He was signed by the Pittsburgh Steelers as an undrafted free agent in 2008. He was released by the Steelers later in 2008. He played college football at William & Mary.

Potts has also played for the Manchester Wolves in 2009, and the Tulsa Talons

He played for the Tampa Bay Storm of the Arena Football League in 2011. Potts finished the 2011 season with the Richmond Raiders of the Southern Indoor Football League (SIFL) after they lost quarterback Bryan Randall for the season.

References

1985 births
Living people
People from Middletown, Delaware
Players of American football from Delaware
American football quarterbacks
William & Mary Tribe football players
Pittsburgh Steelers players
Manchester Wolves players
Tulsa Talons players
Tampa Bay Storm players
Richmond Raiders players